Thomas Towie was a Scottish footballer who played in the Football League for Derby County and Preston North End in the 1890s.

References

Year of birth unknown
Date of death unknown
Scottish footballers
English Football League players
Preston North End F.C. players
Derby County F.C. players
Dumbarton F.C. players
Renton F.C. players
Celtic F.C. players
Association football forwards